Sochocin  is a town in Płońsk County, Masovian Voivodeship, in central Poland. It is the seat of the gmina (administrative district) called Gmina Sochocin.

The town has a population of 1,945.

History
During the Polish–Soviet War, on August 14–15, 1920, it was the site of a battle between Poles and the invading Russian 15th Army, won by the Poles.

During the German occupation of Poland (World War II), in 1941, the German gendermerie expelled the entire Polish population of the settlement, which was then enslaved as forced labour in the county and region, while the houses and farms were handed over to German colonists as part of the Lebensraum policy.

Sports
The local football club is Wkra Sochocin. It competes in the lower leagues.

References

External links
 Jewish Community in Sochocin on Virtual Shtetl

Cities and towns in Masovian Voivodeship
Płońsk County